Ready Jet Go! is a computer-animated educational children's television series produced by Wind Dancer Films. The series aired new episodes on PBS Kids from February 15, 2016 to May 6, 2019, although re-runs continue to this day. It was created by animator and Hey Arnold! creator Craig Bartlett, and is produced in cooperation with NASA's Jet Propulsion Laboratory. The show teaches science and astronomy.

The show is aimed at children ages 3 to 8. On August 17, 2016, PBS Kids announced the renewal of the series for a second season, which premiered on April 2, 2018.

Plot
Jet Propulsion and his family are from the fictional planet Bortron 7 which orbits around a red dwarf called Bortron. They live at Boxwood Terrace in Washington,
 where they study human customs and Earth environments for a travel guide. Jet has made friends with neighborhood children, including Sydney, Mindy, and Sean, whose parents work at the nearby Deep Space Array. The Propulsions' car turns into a flying saucer, which they frequently use to take the older children into space. Their alien identities are known to Sean, Mindy, and Sydney, but they otherwise make some effort to conceal their origin.

At the end of each episode, scientist Amy Mainzer (also called Astronomer Amy) hosts educational interstitial segments: the segments are not included in the export version.

Episodes

Characters

Main

Bortronians
Jet Propulsion (voiced by Ashleigh Ball) is the title character of the show and is a humanoid alien. He has red hair and can stretch his body, as his parents can. He is excitable, energetic, and goofy. He is tall for his age. Jet is 63 years old in Bortronian years, as revealed in "Earthday Birthday". He was instantly popular with the other children the moment he arrived on Earth. He sees the mundane world as a vast and exciting place and even thinks that words are exciting, such as "surprise", claiming it to be a funny Earth word. He is named after the Jet Propulsion Laboratory. He is shown to be extremely kind, even to people who are mean to him, such as Mitchell.
Sunspot Propulsion is the Propulsion family pet. He is described as a dog or cat to "Earthies" not in the know. Sunspot has the ears of a rabbit, the body of a kangaroo, and the tail of a raccoon or a fox. He plays concertina, electric guitar, bugle, pan pipes, and drums. Sunspot is silly and likes to play. His status as a mere "pet" may be somewhat of a put-on: He knows how to read, can talk and sing, and can follow conversations, but often seems confused about what behaviors are expected from a pet. He often functions as a deus ex machina, figuring out what is going on and what needs to be done and then conveying that information to one or more of the children. Carrot and Jet both realize there's more to Sunspot than the obvious, as evidenced by a conversation in "The Greatest Canyon": Carrot: "You ever get the idea there's something he's not telling us?" Jet: "All the time, Dad. All the time."  In "Back to Bortron 7", a large Sunspot-like character is shown to be Carrot and Celery's boss, meaning the species is equal among the Bortronians.
Carrot Propulsion (voiced by Kyle Rideout) is Jet's father named after the food carrot. His name from his home planet includes the sound of an elephant trumpeting and a parrot squawking. He tends to be goofy, like Jet. He often stays home while Celery takes the children on adventures into outer space, as he doesn't really like going in the flying saucer. Carrot often cooks wacky dishes such as deep-fried lollipops.
Celery Propulsion (voiced by Meg Roe) is Jet's mother named after the food celery. Celery is smart and often takes the children to space. Her name from her home planet includes the sounds of banging, buzzing, and clanging. She normally drives the family vehicle, as Carrot's driving makes her nervous. She likes racing against her brother, Zucchini.
Face 9000 (voiced by Brian Drummond) is a computer. He is a cyan face with blue facial features projected from a small, round ball. He has a younger brother, Face 9001. Face 9000 knows everything about science, and often pops up to answer the children's science questions. In "Face on the Fritz", he gets an upgrade. He has a tendency to get jealous easily.

Earthies
Collective name for Earth natives used by the Bortronians.
Sydney Skelley (voiced by Dalila Bela (season 1), Vienna Leacock (in Back to Bortron 7-season 2)) is a girl with black hair and green eyes. She idolizes a character named Commander Cressida, named after the moon of Uranus, who has a dog named Sirius, named after the brightest star in Earth's night sky. Sydney is imaginative and very friendly, often acting as the voice of reason for the kids. In "How Come the Moon Changes Shape?" she danced with Jet, in "Kid Kart Derby" she hugged him. Her mother is Dr. Amy Skelley. Sydney's motto is "A kid's place is exploring space." Her friendship with the Propulsion family gives her many opportunities to do just that, which makes her a happy girl. She is named after Sydney, Australia.
Sean Rafferty (voiced by William Ainscough (seasons 1-Our Sun is a Star!), Grady Ainscough (in You Can Call Me Albedo-Moon Face), Glen Gordon (in Lone Star 2 - Rocket Kids!-Sean Has a Cold) is a boy with light brown hair, gray eyes, and freckles. Sean probably has asthma; he is shown breathing into a brown paper bag in "Jet Cooks Dinner", and he mentions once when the children are in space that sometimes he has trouble breathing. He is smart and wants to be an astronaut when he grows up, but he has slight claustrophobia. Sean likes to follow the Scientific Method, as shown in many episodes; he even has his own song about it. His mother is Dr. Rafferty. Sean idolizes Neil Armstrong, and has his action figure, which he takes along on their space trips.
Mindy Melendez (voiced by Jaeda Lily Miller) is a 5-year-old girl (she was previously four, but turned five in episode "Mindy Turns Five") with brown eyes, dark brown hair in two pigtails, and a hat that looks like a teddy-bear face. In season 1, she stayed on Earth when the others went into outer space; she was not allowed to go any further than Jet's backyard. In season 2 she became allowed to travel past Jet's backyard, as she turned five, so she now accompanies the others as they travel into space. She is the only one who knows Mitchell is spying on Jet and is out to expose him.

Supporting

Bortronians
Zucchini (voiced by Ian James Corlett) is Jet's maternal uncle and Celery's brother named after the food zucchini. He is a garbage collector on Bortron and works for the East Galaxy Garbage Company, Bortron 7 Division, using the Big Bortronian Junk Sucker (BBJS). He is very kind to the kids, but also dimwitted at times.
Moonbeam is the pet of Uncle Zucchini. She looks similar to Sunspot, but Moonbeam is blue and plays electric guitar (left-handed).
Eggplant (voiced by Tabitha St. Germain) is Jet's aunt, Zucchini's wife, and Zerk's mom. She is an intergalactic travel writer just like Carrot and Celery.
Zerk (voiced by Meg Roe) is Jet's cousin. He calls Jet to ask when the first Earthie visited Bortron. He visits Earth in "Zerk Visits Earth." Zerk is very energetic and hyperactive. In "Whole Lotta Shakin'" and "Asteroid Belt Space Race", he is shown to be very competitive.
Spinach is Celery's cousin. Celery calls him when the van/flying saucer is not working and she needs advice.

Earthies
Mitchell Peterson (voiced by Spencer Drever (season 1), David Raynolds (season 2), Dylan Schombing (One Small Step)) looks similar to Sean except that he wears glasses and a hat. Along with Mindy, he is younger than Jet, Sean, and Sydney. For his age, he appears to be smarter than Mindy, even knowing about and building an exact replica of the Saturn V rocket. Mitchell has a tendency to be sarcastic and sometimes blunt. He always wants to expose Jet's alien identity but inevitably fails. Nonetheless, Jet is nice to him. A running gag in the series is whenever he is spying on Jet, Mindy sneaks up on him which he finds annoying. In "Holidays in Boxwood Terrace" it is revealed that he only pretends to be mean and he is really shy and wants to be friends with Jet, Sean, Sydney, and Mindy, but he doesn't know how to do it. In the end, the kids welcome him into their group. His grandfather was a farmer, which he mentions in "Eye in the Sky."
Mr. Peterson is Mitchell's dad (voiced by Ian James Corlett) and addresses other people by their last names, calling Mitchell "Peterson" and using "Propulsion" to refer to Jet and Carrot. In the episode "Mindy's Weather Report" he calls himself the self-appointed safety officer for the neighborhood. He, like his son, can be a bit full of himself. He is an expert at playing mini-golf. He is also a big soccer fan.
Dr. Rafferty (voiced by Keegan Connor Tracy) is Sean's scientist mother. She and her co-worker Berg appear in "Visit to Mom's Office." She helps Mindy identify a meteorite in "Mindy's Meteorite Stand." Dr. Rafferty is patient, smart, and loving. In "Visit to Mom's Office", she mentions that she felt like an alien when she was a child.
Dr. Berg (voiced by Brian Drummond) is a man who works with Dr. Rafferty. They later appear as judges for the baking competition. Dr. Berg can be rather silly at times. He loves drinking coffee and always has it in his hand. Sunspot always steals his watch.
Dr. Melendez (voiced by Meg Roe) is Mindy's mother. She is heard calling to Mindy in "More Than One Moon."
Riley is a kid in Sean, Sydney, and Mindy's school. He brought in his favorite snow globe for show and tell. He is not shown.
Lillian (voiced by Amelia Shoichet Stoll) is a friend of Mindy's. The two girls dig a small "Grand Canyon" in a sandbox while the Propulsions and the other children visit Valles Marineris on Mars. Lillian is a girly girl but isn't the sharpest tool in the shed. She can be quite forgetful, seeing as how she told Mindy what her "surprise" present was.
Lillian's mom (voiced by Ashleigh Ball) is heard in "Mindy Turns 5", when she calls Lillian because she has to go to class.
Beep is a robot who lives at the Deep Space Array (DSA). She has a twin sister, Boop, who is a Rover on Mars.
Dr. Skelley (voiced by Brenda Crichlow) is Sydney's mom, who also works at the DSA. Like her daughter, she is also a fan of Commander Cressida. She is a robotics engineer.

Development
The idea for the show dates back to the late 1990s when Linda Simensky complained to Bartlett about how "nobody makes shows about two friends anymore." From that idea, Bartlett came up with Lenny and Nate, a buddy comedy starring two eighth-graders, one of whom believes he is an alien. Years later, while working on Dinosaur Train, Bartlett revamped the idea to be educationally appropriate for PBS, with a specific focus on space and earth science, after he worked on a project for NASA called the Shuttle Launch Experience. Lenny became Jet and Nate became Sean, while both characters were aged down from 13 to 10. The character of Sydney was added, and after testing the initial pilot of children, Mindy was added to appeal to a younger audience. The pilot was titled Jet Propulsion.

During production of the first season, PBS approved of everything that Bartlett and his team came up with, leaving no notes. However, during the second season, the team was approached by the Ready-to-Learn Act, thus bringing a new layer of oversight and executive meddling that made season 2 of the series "hard."

Songs
Ready Jet Go! has many songs; some have no lyrics.
Ready Jet Go! Theme Song
Commander Cressida Theme
How Come The Moon Has Craters?
Night of a Bazillion Stars
The Scientific Method Song
The Solar System Song
Venus! (Earth's Broiling Hot Twin)
Tiny Blue Dot
Intergalactic Travel Writers
The Milky Way
What Goes Up (Must Come Down) aka The Gravity Song
Enceladus vs. Europa aka Which Moon Is Best?
Computers aka The Programming Ditty
Let's Fly Our Little Saucer to the Moon
The 3-Part Bortronian Meal aka Classic 3-Part Bortronian Meal
My Name is Mindy
Try Again
Beep's a Rovin' Superstar aka Jet's Beep Song
Cooking with Jet (no lyrics)
Asteroid Belt (no lyrics)
Building Boogie (no lyrics)
So Many Moons aka 67 Moons
Real Bortronian Deal
Bortronian Is What I Am!
My Name is Jet
Lone Star!
I'm Not Afraid of Big Ideas
A Scientific Town
Is Your Planet Like My Planet?
Take-off Ditty
There's No Planet Like My Planet
The Bortron Solar System Song
That's How We Roll on Bortron 7
Just Add Water
It's a Neptune Kind of Day!
Earthday Birthday
You're Never Too Big for a Lullaby
Dear Santa, From Little Billy
Mindy's Toy-Building Ditty
Solar System Saucer-Sleigh
The Spirit of Christmas
Dear Little Frozen Pluto
A Star is Born!
I'm Finally Five!
The Outer Planets Song
Ice Skating in July
Heliocentric Ditty
Total Eclipse of the Sun
Space Racin'
Grow Plant, Grow!
Engineering Song
Potatoes on Mars 
Get Growin'
Potato Changes
Every Day is Earth Day
The Super Saucer Song

Reception

Ratings
The series has gained 34.3 million viewers, according to PBS, including 10.2 million on broadcast television. It outperformed channel average by 32% in its first three weeks. The series has also been streamed over 146 million times on the PBS Kids website and app since January 2016.

Critical reception
Emily Ashby of Common Sense Media rated it a 5/5, saying "Thoroughly engaging and packed with educational content, this exceptional series is a fun way for kids to learn about science and astronomy. Jet's excitement for the human experience is matched only by Sean and Sydney's eagerness to learn all about outer space; put the three of them together, and it's a true celebration of the joy of discovery. Whether it's executing a rescue mission for a Mars rover or combining daily chores with experiments in force, Jet and his friends have a lot to teach kids through their own experiences."

Gina Catanzarite of Parent's Choice said "Although the vocabulary and science explanations may be beyond the scope of the youngest viewers, the premise, characters, interesting art direction and upbeat action should hold their attention. Older kids are more likely to grasp the facts and even if they don't remember them all, Ready Jet Go! will at the very least inspire curiosity, and plenty of questions when they take the time to gaze up at the skies above them."

Awards and nominations
The series was awarded a Parents' Choice Silver Honor.
The series won a Parents' Choice Award again in 2018.
The series was awarded a Common Sense Seal by Common Sense Media.
Jaeda Lily Miller was nominated for a Young Artist Award for her performance as Mindy
Cynopsis Kids Imagination Awards:
2017: Nominated for Best Use of Music in a Kids Series, Educational Series/Special – STEM, Mobile App – Preschool, Preschool Series, and won Song for a TV Series/Special/Movie, tied with Splash and Bubbles.
2018: Won Best Use of Music in a Kids' Series, tied with Wonderama, Online Game tied with The Loud House: Lights Out, and was nominated for Preschool Series or Special.
Back to Bortron 7 was nominated for an Environmental Media Award for Children's Television.

Games
PBS Kids and Two Moos created ten online games based on the show:
Sydney's Astro-Tracker
Mindy's Constellation Exploration
Sean's Rescue Quest
Jet's Planet Pinball
Jet's Rocket Ship Creator
Mission Earth
Mindy's Moonball
Jet's Bot Builder
Rover Maker
Cooking School

Also on iTunes:
Space Explorer released 7 April 2016

Broadcast
Due to the national success of Ready Jet Go!, the series has been distributed to countries around the world and dubbed into over 20 different languages, enabling it to become internationally successful as well.

In September 2016, the series premiered in Canada on Knowledge Network during the Knowledge Kids block. It also has aired on BBC Kids there. In November of that same year, the series premiered in South Korea on EBS1. The Korean dub of the show was the first foreign-language dub to be produced and aired.

On January 25, 2017, the series premiered in Israel on Educational 23, and later on Kan Educational until November 14, 2020. On February 24 of that same year, the series premiered on Yle TV2 in Finland as part of Pikku Kakkonen, under the title Jetron matkaan. Latin American Spanish and Brazilian Portuguese dubs later premiered on Nat Geo Kids that same year, with the Spanish dub premiering on July 1 and the Portuguese dub on September 20.

In January 2017, the series premiered on LTV1 in Latvia. The show is broadcast in English with one man translating all the characters’ lines to Latvian in the form of a voiceover. On April 13, 2019, the second season premiered.

Beginning February 17, 2021, the series began broadcasting on television in Russia. That same year, the series premiered June 28 on TV Derana in Sri Lanka with a Sinhala dub, and September 27 on Aqlvoy in Uzbekistan under the title Diqqat Jet Olg’a!

Film
In 2021, two years after the show's final episode aired, Bartlett confirmed that new songs were being recorded for the series. A year later, he confirmed on The Arun Mehta Show podcast that the songs were for an 80-minute Ready Jet Go! movie in production for Universal Pictures. The film is in animation as of October 2022, and will go into post-production in spring 2023.

References

External links
 
 

PBS original programming
2010s American animated television series
2016 American television series debuts
2019 American television series endings
2010s Canadian animated television series
2016 Canadian television series debuts
2019 Canadian television series endings
American children's animated space adventure television series
American children's animated science fiction television series
American children's animated education television series
American computer-animated television series
American television series with live action and animation
Animated television series about children
Animated television series about extraterrestrial life
Canadian children's animated space adventure television series
Canadian children's animated science fiction television series
Canadian children's animated education television series
Canadian computer-animated television series
Canadian television series with live action and animation
English-language television shows
Television series created by Craig Bartlett
PBS Kids shows
Television shows set in Washington (state)